Myrothamnus is a genus of flowering plants, consisting of two species of small xerophytic  shrubs, in the southern parts of tropical Africa and in Madagascar. Myrothamnus is recognized as the only genus in the family Myrothamnaceae.

Myrothamnaceae was included in order Hamamelidales in the Cronquist system.  Molecular systematic studies have suggested that Myrothamnus is not closely related to Hamamelidaceae nor any other family included in that order, but rather is closely related to Gunnera. In the APG II system (2003) the genus is assigned to family Gunneraceae or to the optionally recognized segregate family Myrothamnaceae.  In the APG III system (2009) and APG IV system (2016) the narrower circumscription is preferred, and these two families are considered distinct

Species
Species of Myrothamnus are dioecious shrubs.
 Myrothamnus flabellifolius Welw. - Angola, Southern Africa, Zimbabwe
 Myrothamnus moschata (Baill.) Baill. - Madagascar

References

External links
 
 NCBI Taxonomy Browser
Myrothamnaceae in Stevens, P. F. (2001 onwards). Angiosperm Phylogeny Website. Version 7, May 2006.
 Myrothamnaceae in L. Watson and M.J. Dallwitz (1992 onwards). The families of flowering plants: descriptions, illustrations, identification, information retrieval. Version: 21 May 2006. http://delta-intkey.com
 links at CSDL

Gunnerales
Eudicot genera
Dioecious plants
Afrotropical realm flora